Carol Tomlinson-Keasey was the former chancellor of the University of California, Merced. She held a Ph.D. from the University of California, Berkeley, and was a professor at the university's School of Social Sciences, Humanities, and Arts. Her research interests included developmental psychology and development of cognitive potential. She announced her resignation in March 2006, and continued her duties until August 31, 2006.

Before becoming chancellor at University of California, Merced, Tomlinson-Keasey was vice provost for academic initiatives for the University of California system.  She also taught and held administrative positions at University of California, Riverside and University of California, Davis.

Death
She died on October 10, 2009, aged 66, at her home in Decatur, Georgia from breast cancer.

References

External links
UC Merced Website

American women psychologists
20th-century American psychologists
University of California, Berkeley alumni
University of California, Merced faculty
University of California, Berkeley faculty
Deaths from breast cancer
Deaths from cancer in Georgia (U.S. state)
1940s births
2009 deaths
20th-century American women
20th-century American people
21st-century American women
Women heads of universities and colleges
20th-century American academics